The Beverly Hillbillies is an American television sitcom that was broadcast on CBS from 1962 to 1971. It had an ensemble cast featuring Buddy Ebsen, Irene Ryan, Donna Douglas, and Max Baer Jr. as the Clampetts, a poor, backwoods family from the hills of the Ozarks, who move to posh Beverly Hills, California, after striking oil on their land. The show was produced by Filmways and was created by Paul Henning. It was followed by two other Henning-inspired "country cousin" series on CBS: Petticoat Junction and its spin-off Green Acres, which reversed the rags-to-riches, country-to-city model of The Beverly Hillbillies.

The Beverly Hillbillies ranked among the top 20 most-watched programs on television for eight of its nine seasons, ranking as the No. 1 series of the year during its first two seasons, with 16 episodes that still remain among the 100 most-watched television episodes in American history. It accumulated seven Emmy nominations during its run. It remains in syndicated reruns, and its ongoing popularity spawned a 1993 film adaptation by 20th Century Fox.

Premise
The series starts with Jed Clampett, an impoverished and widowed hillbilly living alongside an oil-rich swamp with his daughter and mother-in-law. The start of each episode shows Jed discovering oil while shooting at a rabbit. However, in the first episode the oil is discovered by a surveyor for the OK Oil Company who realizes the size of the oil field, and the company pays him a fortune for the right to drill on his land. Patriarch Jed's cousin Pearl Bodine prods him to move to California after being told his modest property could yield millions of dollars, and pressures him into taking her son Jethro along. The family moves into a mansion in wealthy Beverly Hills, California, next door to Jed's banker, Milburn Drysdale, and his wife, Margaret, who has zero tolerance for hillbillies.

The Clampetts bring a moral, unsophisticated, and minimalistic lifestyle to the swanky, sometimes self-obsessed and superficial community. Double entendres and cultural misconceptions are the core of the sitcom's humor. Plots often involve Drysdale's outlandish efforts to keep the Clampetts' money in his bank, and his wife's efforts to rid the neighborhood of "those hillbillies". The family's periodic attempts to return to the mountains are often prompted by Granny's perceiving a slight from one of the "city folk".

Characters

Jed Clampett
Jed Clampett (portrayed by Buddy Ebsen), has little formal education and is completely naïve about the world outside the area where he lives, but has a great deal of wisdom and common sense. His forebears are revealed in series 1 episode 25 to have come to America before the Mayflower arrived. However he later denies this to keep Mrs. Drysdale happy. He is the widower of Granny's daughter, Rose Ellen (though Buddy Ebsen was only 5 years Irene Ryan's junior). He is the son of Luke Clampett and his wife, and has a sister called Myrtle. In episode 13 it is revealed that his grandfather was 98 when he married his grandmother who was 18. Jed is a good-natured man and the head of the family. In a very early episode Jed tells Elly May that she is the spitting image of her mother. The huge oil pool in the swamp he owned was the beginning of his rags-to-riches journey to Beverly Hills. He is usually the straight man to Granny and Jethro's antics. His catchphrase is, "Welllllll, doggies!" Jed was one of the three characters to appear in all 274 episodes of the series.

Granny
Daisy May Moses (portrayed by Irene Ryan in all 274 episodes), called "Granny" by all, is Jed's mother-in-law, so is often called "Granny Clampett" in spite of her last name, and despite the fact that in the pilot episode Milburn Drysdale refers to her as Jed's mother. She is a descendant of the Moses clan who taught her feuding when the Moses drove the Bodkins out of Napoleon, Tennessee. She has an abrasive personality and is quick to anger, but is often overruled by Jed. She is a devout Confederate and fancies herself a Baptist Christian ("dunked, not sprinkled") with forgiveness in her heart. A self-styled "M.D." ("mountain doctor"), Granny uses her "white lightning" brew as a form of anesthesia when commencing painful treatments such as leech bleeding and using pliers for teeth-pulling. Like the other Clampetts, she is known to take things literally, having thought Mrs. Drysdale had turned herself into a bird using black magic (astrology) and mistook an escaped kangaroo for a giant jackrabbit (but failed to convince anyone of its existence).

Paul Henning discarded the idea of making Granny Jed's mother, which would have changed the show's dynamics, making Granny the matriarch and Jed her subordinate.

Elly May Clampett 
Elly May (portrayed by Donna Douglas in all 274 episodes), the only child of Jed and Rose Ellen Clampett, is a mountain beauty with the body of a pin-up girl and the soul of a tomboy. In a very early episode Jed tells Elly May that she is the spitting image of her mother. She can throw a fastball and "wrassle" most men to a fall, and she can be as tender with her friends, animals, and family as she is tough with anyone she wrassles. She says once that animals can be better companions than people, but as she grows older, she allows that, "fellas kin be more fun than critters." In addition to the family dog, Duke (an old Bloodhound), a number of pets live on the Clampett estate thanks to animal-lover Elly. In the 1981 TV movie, Elly May is the head of a zoo.

Elly is a terrible cook. Family members cringe whenever, for plot reasons, Elly takes over the kitchen.

Jethro Bodine

Jethro (portrayed by Max Baer Jr. in 272 episodes) is the dim-witted son of Jed's cousin, Pearl Bodine (though he addresses Jed as "Uncle Jed", as Elly May addresses Pearl as "Aunt Pearl", a customary generational practice).  Pearl's mother and Jed's father were siblings. He drives the Clampett family to their new home in California and stays on with them to further his education. In the first series he is in the fifth grade, having spent three years in the fourth grade and two years in the first grade. He went to Oxford school and this is confused with Oxford University. The others boast of Jethro's education, in later series it is referred to as his "sixth-grade education"; Jethro himself often speaks enthusiastically of his abilities in "cipherin'" (1 and 1 is 2, 2 and 2 is 4), and "gazintas" (4 gazinta 8 2 times, 3 gazinta 12 4 times). However, he is ignorant about nearly every aspect of modern California life. In one episode, he decides to go to college. He enrolls late in the semester at a local secretarial school and "earns" his diploma by the end of the day because he is so disruptive. This was an ironic in-joke – in real life, Max Baer Jr. has a bachelor's degree in business administration, minoring in philosophy, from Santa Clara University.

Many story lines involve Jethro's endless career search. He once deliberated over becoming a brain surgeon or a fry cook. His other ambitions included being a millwright, street car conductor, "double-naught" spy, telephone lineman, soda jerk, chauffeur, USAF general, sculptor, restaurant owner (with Granny's cooking), psychiatrist, and once as a bookkeeper for Milburn Drysdale's bank; an agent for "cousin" Bessie and "Cousin Roy" (see below); Hollywood producer (a studio flunky remarks Jethro has the "right qualifications" for being a producer: a sixth-grade education and an uncle who owns the studio; this in-joke gag as a movie producer was replayed in the 1981 movie). More often than not, his overall goal in these endeavors is to meet pretty girls. He only manages to gain (but is oblivious to) the affections of the plain Miss Jane Hathaway. Of all the Clampett clan, he is the most eager to embrace city life. A running gag is that Jethro is known as the "six-foot stomach" for his huge appetite; in one episode, he eats a jetliner's entire supply of steaks, and in another, Jethro tries to set himself up as a Hollywood agent for cousin "Bessie" the chimpanzee – with a fee of 10,000 bananas for Bessie and 1,000 for him. Another time when "Cousin Roy" (guest star Roy Clark) came from "the hills" to Beverly Hills so as to become a County Music star, Jethro refused to be his agent when Roy became a success. The only time Jethro actually succeded in anything is when a group of teenage Girl Scouts visiting the Clampetts’ mansion had to jump into the cement pond when they were attacked by ants; Jethro got a "Livesaving badge" for rescuing one of the female scouts.  Jethro does not appear in the third- or second-to-last episodes, but Baer remains billed in the title credits.

With the January 2015 death of Donna Douglas, Baer is the only surviving main cast member.

Milburn Drysdale
Mr. Drysdale (portrayed by Raymond Bailey in 247 episodes) is the Clampetts' banker, confidant, and next-door neighbor. He is obsessed with money, and to keep the Clampetts' $96,000,000 (in 1969) in his Commerce Bank, Mr. Drysdale will do everything he can to cater to their every wish. He often forces others, especially his long-suffering secretary, to help fulfill their outlandish requests. He is a descendant of the Bodkins family from Tennessee. It is revealed in the first season that Granny's clan, the Moses family, feuded with the Bodkinses and drove them from Napoleon, Tennessee.

Jane Hathaway

Jane Hathaway (portrayed by Nancy Kulp in 246 episodes), whom the Clampetts address as "Miss Jane", is Drysdale's loyal, highly educated, and efficient secretary. Though she reluctantly carries out his wishes, she is genuinely fond of the family and tries to shield them from her boss's greed. Miss Hathaway frequently has to "rescue" Drysdale from his schemes, receiving little or no thanks for her efforts. The Clampetts consider her family; even Granny, the one most dead-set against living in California, likes her very much. Jane harbors something of a crush on Jethro for most of the series' run. In 1999, TV Guide ranked Jane Hathaway number 38 on its list titled "50 Greatest TV Characters of All Time".

Episodes

Theme music
The show's theme song, "The Ballad of Jed Clampett", was written by producer and writer Paul Henning and originally performed by bluegrass artists Foggy Mountain Boys, led by Lester Flatt and Earl Scruggs. The song is sung by Jerry Scoggins (backed by Flatt and Scruggs) over the opening and end credits of each episode. Flatt and Scruggs subsequently cut their own version of the theme (with Flatt singing) for Columbia Records; released as a single, it reached number 44 on Billboard Hot 100 pop music chart and number one on the Billboard Hot Country chart (the lone country chart-topper for the duo).

Perry Botkin  composed many songs for The Beverly Hillbillies.  Botkin's upbeat tune from Murder by Contract, played during scenes of sunny LA, signaled scenes at the Commerce Bank of Beverly Hills.

The six main cast members participated on a 1963 Columbia soundtrack album, which featured original song numbers in character. Additionally, Ebsen, Ryan, and Douglas each made a few solo recordings following the show's success, including Ryan's 1966 novelty single, "Granny's Miniskirt".

The series generally features no country music beyond the bluegrass banjo theme song, although country star Roy Clark and the team of Flatt and Scruggs occasionally play on the program. Pop singer Pat Boone appears in one episode as himself, under the premise that he hails from the same area of the country as the Clampetts, although Boone is a native of Jacksonville, Florida.

The 1989 film UHF featured a "Weird Al" Yankovic parody music video, "Money for Nothing/Beverly Hillbillies*", combining "The Ballad of Jed Clampett" and English rock band Dire Straits' 1985 hit song "Money for Nothing".

Reception

The Beverly Hillbillies received generally poor reviews from contemporary critics. The New York Times called the show "strained and unfunny"; Variety called it "painful to sit through". Film professor Janet Staiger writes that "the problem for these reviewers was that the show confronted the cultural elite's notions of quality entertainment." The show did receive a somewhat favorable review from noted critic Gilbert Seldes in the December 15, 1962 TV Guide: "The whole notion on which The Beverly Hillbillies is founded is an encouragement to ignorance... But it is funny. What can I do?"

Regardless of the poor reviews, the show shot to the top of the Nielsen ratings shortly after its premiere and stayed there for several seasons. During its first two seasons, it was the number-one program in the U.S; during its second season, it earned some of the highest ratings ever recorded for a half-hour sitcom. The season-two episode "The Giant Jackrabbit" also became the most-watched telecast up to the time of its airing, and remains the most-watched half-hour episode of a sitcom, as well. The series enjoyed excellent ratings throughout its run, although it had fallen out of the top 20 most-watched shows during its final season.

In 1997, the season-three episode "Hedda Hopper's Hollywood" was ranked number 62 on "TV Guides 100 Greatest Episodes of All Time".

Nielsen ratings

Cancellation

The show was canceled in the spring of 1971 after 274 episodes. The CBS network, prompted by pressure from advertisers seeking a more sophisticated urban audience, decided to refocus its schedule on new urban-themed shows and, to make room for them, the two remaining series of CBS's rural-themed comedies were cancelled. This action came to be known as "the Rural Purge". Pat Buttram, who played Mr. Haney on Green Acres, famously remarked, "It was the year CBS cancelled everything with a tree – including Lassie."

Reunions

1981 CBS film
In 1981, Return of the Beverly Hillbillies television film, written and produced by series creator Henning, was aired on the CBS network. Irene Ryan had died in 1973, and Raymond Bailey had died in 1980. The script acknowledged Granny's passing, but featured Imogene Coca as Granny's mother. Max Baer decided against reprising the role that both started and stymied his career, so the character of Jethro Bodine was given to another actor, Ray Young.

The film's plot had Jed back in his old homestead in Bugtussle, having divided his massive fortune among Elly May and Jethro, both of whom stayed on the West Coast. Jane Hathaway had become a Department of Energy agent and was seeking Granny's "White Lightnin'" recipe to combat the energy crisis. Since Granny had gone on to "her re-ward", it was up to Granny's centenarian "Maw" (Imogene Coca) to divulge the secret brew's ingredients. Subplots included Jethro playing an egocentric, starlet-starved Hollywood producer, Jane and her boss (Werner Klemperer) having a romance, and Elly May owning a large petting zoo. The four main characters finally got together by the end of the story.

Having been filmed a mere decade after the final episode of the original series, viewer consensus was that the series' original spirit was lost to the film on many fronts, chief of which being the deaths of Ryan and Bailey and Baer's absence, which left only three of the six original cast members available to reprise their respective roles. Further subtracting from the familiarity was the fact that the legendary Clampett mansion (the Sumner Spaulding-designed Chartwell Mansion) – was unavailable for a location shoot as the owners' lease was too expensive. Henning himself admitted sheer embarrassment when the finished product aired, blaming his inability to rewrite the script due to the 1981 Writers Guild of America strike.

1993 special
In 1993, Ebsen, Douglas, and Baer reunited onscreen for the only time in the CBS-TV retrospective television special, The Legend of the Beverly Hillbillies, which ranked as the fourth-most watched television program of the week—a major surprise given the mediocre rating for the 1981 television film. It was a rare tribute from the "Tiffany network", which owed much of its success in the 1960s to the series, but has often seemed embarrassed by it in hindsight, often downplaying the show in retrospective television specials on the network's history and rarely inviting cast members to participate in such all-star broadcasts.

The Legend of The Beverly Hillbillies special ignored several plot twists of the television film, notably Jethro was now not a film director, but a leading Los Angeles physician. Critter-loving Elly May was still in California with her animals, but Jed was back home in the Hills, having lost his fortune, stolen by the now-imprisoned banker Drysdale. Nancy Kulp had died in 1991 and was little referred to beyond the multitude of film clips that dotted the special. The special was released on VHS tape by CBS/Fox Video in 1995 and as a bonus feature on the Official Third Season DVD Set in 2009.

Controversy
In 1974, CBS made a reportedly large cash payment settlement to employee Hamilton Morgen after Morgen sued the network. Morgen claimed CBS appropriated his submitted ideas and script for a show called Country Cousins to form The Beverly Hillbillies.

Syndication

The Beverly Hillbillies is still televised daily around the world in syndication. In the United States, the show is broadcast currently on MeTV, Circle, Classic Reruns TV, GAC Family and Laff and was previously on TBS Superstation, Nick at Nite, TV Land, Hallmark Channel, and Superstation WGN. A limited number of episodes from the earlier portions of the series run have turned up in the public domain and as such are seen occasionally on many smaller networks such as Retro TV and MyFamily TV.

MeTV Network airs The Beverly Hillbillies Saturday mornings at 6 A.M. Eastern Time.

The show is distributed by CBS Media Ventures, the syndication arm of CBS Television Studios and the CBS network. It was previously distributed by CBS Films, Viacom Enterprises, Paramount Domestic Television, and CBS Paramount Domestic Television (all through corporate changes involving TV distribution rights to the early CBS library). The repeats of the show that debuted on CBS Daytime on September 5–9, 1966, as "Mornin' Beverly Hillbillies" through September 10, 1971 and on September 13–17, 1971 as "The Beverly Hillbillies" lasted up to winter 1971–72. It aired at 11:00–11:30 am Eastern/10:00-10:30 am Central through September 3, 1971, then moved to 10:30–11:00 am Eastern/9:30–10:00 am Central for the last season on CBS Daytime.

Home media and legal status

Fifty-five episodes of the series are in the public domain (all 36 season-one episodes and 19 season-two episodes), because Orion Television, successor to Filmways, neglected to renew their copyrights. As a result, these episodes have been released on home video and DVD on many low-budget labels and shown on low-power television stations and low-budget networks in  prints. In many video prints of the public domain episodes, the original theme music has been replaced by generic music due to copyright issues.

Before his death, Paul Henning, whose estate now holds the original film elements to the public domain episodes, authorized MPI Home Video to release the best of the first two seasons on DVD, the first "ultimate collection" of which was released in the fall of 2005. These collections include the original, uncut versions of the first season's episodes, complete with their original theme music and opening sponsor plugs. Volume 1 has, among its bonus features, the alternate, unaired version of the pilot film, The Hillbillies Of Beverly Hills (the version of the episode that sold the series to CBS), and the "cast commercials" (cast members pitching the products of the show's sponsors) originally shown at the end of each episode. The alternate version is also the version seen on Amazon Prime Video.

With the exception of the public domain episodes, the copyrights to the series were renewed by Orion Television. However, any new compilation of Hillbillies material will be copyrighted by either MPI Media Group or CBS, depending on the content of the material used.

For many years, 20th Century Fox, through a joint venture with CBS called CBS/Fox Video, released select episodes of Hillbillies on videocassette. After Viacom merged with CBS in 1999, Paramount Home Entertainment (the video division of Paramount Pictures, which was acquired by Viacom in 1994) took over the video rights.

In 2006, Paramount announced plans to release the copyrighted episodes in boxed sets through CBS DVD later that year. The show's second season (consisting of the public domain episodes from that season) was released on DVD in Region 1 on October 7, 2008, as "...The Official Second Season". The third season was released on February 17, 2009. Both seasons are available to be purchased together from major online retailers. On October 1, 2013, season four was released on DVD as a Walmart exclusive. It was released as a full retail release on April 15, 2014. On April 26, 2016, CBS/Paramount released the complete first season on DVD. The fifth season was released on October 2, 2018.

With so much work that has to be done to remaster the seasons, and a limited public appeal after 60 years, future remastered, unedited DVD releases are in doubt.

Spin-offs and associated merchandise

Theatrical adaptation
A three-act stage play based on the pilot was written by David Rogers in 1968.

The Deadly Hillbillies, an interactive murder mystery, was written by John R. Logue using the core cast of characters as inspiration. This Gypsy Productions Murder Mystery Parody features characters such as Jed Clumpett, Daisy May Mostes, and Jane Hatchaway.

Comics
Dell Comics adapted the series into a comic book series in 1962. The art work was provided by Henry Scarpelli. The comic ran for 18 issues, ending in August 1967.

Feature film
In 1993, a film version of The Beverly Hillbillies was released starring Jim Varney as Jed Clampett and featuring Buddy Ebsen in a cameo as Barnaby Jones, the lead character in his long-running post-Hillbillies television series.

Computer game 
Based on The Beverly Hillbillies movie, a PC computer adventure game for operating system MS-DOS was developed by Synergistic Software, Inc. and published in 1993 by Capstone Software.

See also
 Chartwell Mansion

References

External links

 
 Watch full episodes of The Beverly Hillbillies on TVLand.com
 The Beverly Hillbillies at the Museum of Broadcast Communications
 Beverly Hillbillies Theme Bluegrass Lyrics (The Ballad of Jed Clampett)
 All 55 public domain episodes (Season 1 and part of 2) 
 

 
1962 American television series debuts
1971 American television series endings
1960s American sitcoms
1970s American sitcoms
Articles containing video clips
Black-and-white American television shows
CBS original programming
Dell Comics titles
English-language television shows
Nielsen ratings winners
Television series about families
Television series by CBS Studios
Television shows filmed in Los Angeles
Television shows set in Beverly Hills, California
Television shows adapted into comics
Television shows adapted into films
Television shows adapted into plays
Television shows adapted into video games
Television shows set in California
Television series by Filmways
Ozarks in fiction